Rush Hour 2 is a 2001 American buddy action comedy film directed by Brett Ratner and written by Jeff Nathanson, based on the characters created by Ross LaManna. A sequel to Rush Hour, it is the second installment in the Rush Hour franchise and stars Jackie Chan and Chris Tucker reprising their roles from the first film. The story follows Chief Inspector Lee (Chan) and LAPD Detective James Carter (Tucker), who go to Hong Kong on vacation only to be thwarted by a murder case involving two U.S. customs agents after a bombing at the American embassy. Lee suspects that the crime is linked to the Triad crime lord Ricky Tan (Lone).

Rush Hour 2 opened on August 3, 2001, to generally mixed reviews. The film was a commercial success, grossing $347.3 million worldwide, making it the highest-grossing film in the franchise. It became the year's 11th-highest-grossing film worldwide as well as the second-highest-grossing PG-13 film. A sequel, Rush Hour 3, was released on August 10, 2007.

Plot
LAPD Detective James Carter is in Hong Kong on vacation with his partner, Hong Kong Police Force Chief Inspector Lee. His vacation is put on hold when a bomb at the US Consulate General kills two undercover US Customs agents. Lee is assigned to the case and discovers that his late father's police partner, Ricky Tan, is somehow involved. Lee and Carter attempt to question Ricky, now a leader of the Triads, resulting in a brawl with his bodyguards.

The U.S. Secret Service, led by Agent Sterling, and the Hong Kong Police Force fight over jurisdiction of the case. Lee's office is bombed and Lee, unaware Carter has left the building, believes him dead. They cross paths at a party on Ricky's yacht, where Ricky scolds his underling, Hu Li. Lee and Carter confront Ricky, who claims he is being framed by his enemies and asks for protection, but Hu Li shoots him and escapes. Sterling holds Lee responsible for Ricky's death and orders him off the case. Carter is ordered back to Los Angeles, but convinces Lee to return to Los Angeles with him.

Carter assures Lee that every large criminal operation has a rich white man behind it; in this case, he believes that man is Steven Reign, a billionaire Los Angeles hotelier he saw acting suspiciously at Ricky Tan's party. Staking out Reign Towers, they spot Isabella Molina, whom Carter met on Ricky's yacht, receiving a delivery from Hu Li. Mistaking the package for another bomb, Lee and Carter try to intervene, but Molina reveals she is an undercover U.S. Secret Service agent, looking into Reign's laundering of $100 million in superdollars.

Lee and Carter visit Kenny, an ex-con, now Carter’s informant who runs a gambling den in the back of his Chinese restaurant. He tells them about a customer with a suspicious amount of hundred-dollar bills, which Carter confirms are Reign's counterfeits. They trace the money to a bank, where they are captured by Hu Li. Taken to Las Vegas in a Triad truck, Lee and Carter escape, realizing that Reign is laundering the $100 million through his new Red Dragon Casino.

At the Red Dragon, Molina points Lee to the engraving plates used to print the counterfeit money, while Carter creates a distraction to help Lee sneak past security. Hu Li captures Lee, taping an explosive in his mouth before bringing him to Ricky, who is still alive. When Ricky departs, Molina tries to arrest Hu Li but is shot, and Lee removes the explosive before it detonates, evacuating the casino.

Carter fights Hu Li, accidentally taking her out with a spear, while Lee pursues Ricky. In the penthouse, Reign prepares to escape with the plates but Ricky fatally stabs him. Lee and Carter confront Ricky, who admits to killing Lee's father. In the ensuing scuffle, Ricky falls to his death when Lee accidentally kicks him out of the window. Hu Li enters the room with a time bomb, forcing Lee and Carter to escape on a makeshift zip line as Hu Li dies in the explosion.

Later at the airport, Molina thanks Lee for his work on the case and kisses him. Planning to go their separate ways, Lee and Carter change their minds when Carter reveals the large amount of money he won at the casino, and the pair head to New York City to indulge themselves.

Cast
 Jackie Chan as  Chief Inspector Lee of the HKPF. He invites Carter to Hong Kong for a vacation but accepts a case involving Ricky Tan, the man who killed his father.
 Chris Tucker as LAPD Detective James Carter, who is in Hong Kong for vacation but quickly becomes entangled in an international investigation.
 John Lone as Ricky Tan, a Triad gangster working with Steven Reign.
 Zhang Ziyi as Hu Li, a Triad assassin and enforcer.
 Roselyn Sánchez as Agent Isabella Molina of the Secret Service. She is working undercover, posing as a corrupt agent while also enlisting Lee and Carter to help her stop the Triads.
 Alan King as Steven Reign, a corrupt Los Angeles businessman in league with the Triads to use his new casino to launder counterfeit money.
 Harris Yulin as Special Agent-In-Charge Sterling
 Kenneth Tsang as Captain Chin
 Don Cheadle as Kenny, the owner of a Chinese restaurant in L.A. that also houses an illegal gambling den.  
 Joel McKinnon Miller as Tex
Jeremy Piven, Saul Rubinek, and Gianni Russo have cameo appearances as a Versace salesman, a casino box man, and a pit boss respectively.

Production

Filming
Filming took place between December 11, 2000 and April 30, 2001.

Fake-money controversy
The prop masters for the film created approximately $1trillion in fake money to be used as props in the film. The money was realistic enough that some of the film's extras pocketed it and attempted to spend it illegally outside of the production, which led to said fake money being confiscated and destroyed by the United States Secret Service.

Music

Lalo Schifrin returned to compose the score for the film. According to him, "The music for Rush Hour 2 is completely different from Rush Hour. The first 20–30 seconds of the main title is a reprise of the music from Rush Hour – but that's it." He said that Ratner had requested a "symphonic score", which he incidentally found suitable for Rush Hour 2:

For the sequel, he asked me to do a symphonic score. It was bigger than life – like an epic score. I ignored the comedy – the actors took care of that. I played to the chases and the danger. It's a serious score in the sense of an "epic" score, like Raiders of the Lost Ark or an Errol Flynn film.  Also, you must realize that the symphony orchestra allows many more possibilities. Mozart didn't need a rhythm section to "drive". I was able to create a lot of energy without the use of drums and electric guitars and all that.

Schifrin performed the Rush Hour 2 score with the Hollywood Studio Symphony. Varèse Sarabande released the soundtrack album on compact disc in August 2001. In a 2001 interview with Dan Goldwasser for Soundtrack.Net, Schifrin was asked whether he would score Rush Hour 3, and he stated: "Oh, I'm not a prophet!"

Release
Before its August 3 release, Rush Hour 2 premiered on July 26, 2001, on-board the United Airlines Flight 1 from Los Angeles to Hong Kong renamed, "The Rush Hour Express". The Hong Kong Board of Tourism teamed up with United Airlines and New Line Cinema in a campaign that offered both trailers for the movie for passengers on all domestic United flights during July and August reaching an expected three million people, as well as Hong Kong travel videos to inspire tourists to visit the country where the film was set.

Box office 
Rush Hour 2 earned $226.2 million in North America and an estimated $121.2 million in other countries, for a worldwide total of $347.3 million (surpassing Rush Hour and Rush Hour 3s worldwide box-office receipts). The film was number one during its opening weekend, grossing $67.4 million at 3,118 locations. The film stayed in the Top 10 until October 11 (10 weeks total). It became one of the four 2001 films to generate $60 million in their first three days of release, with the others being Monsters, Inc., The Mummy Returns and Planet of the Apes. The film also had the fourth-highest opening weekend of all time, behind the latter two films and The Lost World: Jurassic Park. Additionally, Rush Hour 2 achieved two other records during its opening weekend, beating The Sixth Sense for having the biggest August opening weekend and Austin Powers: The Spy Who Shagged Me for scoring the largest opening weekend for a New Line Cinema film. The August opening weekend record would be held for six years before getting surpassed by The Bourne Ultimatum in 2007. Despite being overtaken by American Pie 2, the film made $31.5 million during its second weekend. It was 2001's second-highest-grossing PG-13 film and the 11th highest-grossing film worldwide. Rush Hour 2 surpassed the 1984 film The Karate Kid as the highest-grossing martial arts action film, and was ranked as the second-highest-grossing buddy comedy film behind the 1997 film Men in Black. The film was also ranked as the third-highest-grossing second installments in live action comedy film franchises (behind the 2004 film Meet the Fockers and the 2011 film The Hangover Part II).

Reception
Reviews for Rush Hour 2 were  mixed. On Rotten Tomatoes, the film has an approval rating of 52% based on 128 reviews, with an average rating of 5.4/10. The website's critical consensus states that the film "doesn't feel as fresh or funny as the first, and the stunts lack some of the intricacy normally seen in Chan's films." On Metacritic, the film has a score of 48 out of 100 based on 28 reviews, indicating "mixed or average reviews". Audiences polled by CinemaScore during Rush Hour 2 opening weekend gave the film an average grade of A on an A+ to F scale.

Roger Ebert gave it one and half stars out of a possible four calling Chris Tucker "an anchor around the ankles of the humor" in the movie. Conversely Robert Koehler of Variety called it a "superior sequel" and "the very model of the limber, transnational Hollywood action comedy".

Awards
Rush Hour 2 earned 27 award nominations and 10 wins, including an MTV Movie Award for Best Fight, a Teen Choice Award for Film-Choice Actor, Comedy, and 3 Kids' Choice Awards: Favorite Movie Actor for Tucker, Favorite Male Butt Kicker for Chan, and Favorite Movie.

Sequel

Because of various issues during development hell and production, Rush Hour 3 wasn't released until August 10, 2007; six years after Rush Hour 2. Rush Hour 3 failed to receive the critical and commercial acclaim of predecessors.

See also
 Buddy cop film
 Jackie Chan filmography

References

External links

 
 

2001 films
2001 action comedy films
2001 martial arts films
2000s American films
2000s buddy comedy films
2000s buddy cop films
2000s English-language films
2000s martial arts comedy films
American action comedy films
American buddy comedy films
American buddy cop films
American martial arts comedy films
American police detective films
American sequel films
Counterfeit money in film
Films about the Los Angeles Police Department
Films about the United States Secret Service
Films directed by Brett Ratner
Films produced by Roger Birnbaum
Films scored by Lalo Schifrin
Films set in 1997
Films set in Los Angeles
Films set in Hong Kong
Films set in the Las Vegas Valley
Films shot in Los Angeles
Films shot in Hong Kong
Films shot in the Las Vegas Valley
Films with screenplays by Jeff Nathanson
Impact of the September 11 attacks on cinema
Kung fu films
New Line Cinema films
Rush Hour (franchise)
Triad films
2000s Hong Kong films